The Women's 3,000 metres Steeplechase event at the 2005 World Championships in Athletics was held on August 6 and August 8 at the Helsinki Olympic Stadium. It was the first women's steeplechase to be held at the World Championships. The first three of each heat (Q) plus the six fastest times (q) qualified for the final.

Medalists

Schedule
All times are Eastern European Time (UTC+2)

Abbreviations
All results shown are in minutes

Startlist

Results

Heat 1

Heat 2

Heat 3

Final

External links
IAAF results (heats)
IAAF results (final)
todor66

3000 steeplechase women
Steeplechase at the World Athletics Championships
2005 in women's athletics